This is a list of aviation-related events from 1933:

Events 
 The United States Coast Guard requests authorization to construct its first cutters with a capability of carrying aircraft.
 Tokyo conducts its first blackout exercise.
 The Berliner-Joyce Aircraft Corporation is absorbed into North American Aviation.
 The Royal Air Force declares the Avro 504 obsolete after 20 years of service.

January
 January 2 – After modifications, HMS Courageous reenters service with the Royal Navy as the worlds first aircraft carrier equipped with hydraulically controlled arresting gear.
 January 2–3 – During the Battle of Shanhai Pass, a squadron of Imperial Japanese Army bombers provides close air support to Japanese Kwantung Army ground forces in action against the Nationalist Chinese National Revolutionary Army at the Shanhai Pass at the fortified eastern end of the Great Wall of China.
 January 7 – Bert Hinkler dies in the crash of his de Havilland Puss Moth on the north slope of the Pratomagno in Italy's Apennine Mountains on the first leg of his attempt to break the time record for a flight from the United Kingdom to Australia. His body is not found until 27 April.
 January 12 – Marcel Lalouette and Jean de Permangle fly a Farman F.231 from Istres, France, to Villa Cisneros, French West Africa in 22 hours, setting a new distance record by flying .
 January 16 – With aircraft manufacturer René Couzinet on board, Jean Mermoz and crew make a non-stop flight across the South Atlantic Ocean from Saint-Louis, Senegal, to Natal, Brazil, in 17 hours 27 minutes in the Couzinet 70 Arc-en-ciel III.

February
 February 2 – Spartan Air Lines is formed to make use of the Spartan Cruiser airliner. The airline will begin flight operations on April 12.
 February 6–8 – Royal Air Force Squadron Leader Oswald Gayford and Flight Lieutenant Gilbert Nicholetts make the first non-stop flight from England to South Africa in a Fairey Long-range Monoplane. The  flight is a new distance record and takes 57 hours 25 minutes.
 February 6–9 – Jim Mollison flies a de Havilland Puss Moth from England to Brazil, via Senegal, across the South Atlantic Ocean, making him the first person to fly solo across both the North and South Atlantic.
 February 25 – , the United States Navy's first ship designed from the outset as an aircraft carrier, is launched.

March
 March 28 – The Imperial Airways Armstrong Whitworth Argosy airliner City of Liverpool catches fire in the air over Belgium and crashes, killing the crew of three and all 12 passengers, the deadliest accident in the history of British civil aviation up to this date. The fire may have been started deliberately.
 March 31 – The Ford 4-AT-B Trimotor NC7686, carrying members of the Winnipeg Toilers basketball team from Tulsa, Oklahoma, to Winnipeg, Manitoba, Canada, on a charter flight, crashes near Neodesha, Kansas, probably while attempting a forced landing in a field. The crash kills both crew members and five of the 11 passengers.

April
 April 1 – The Indian Air Force is formed.
 April 3
 Two British aircraft, the Westland PV-3 and Westland PV-6 piloted by Squadron Leader the Marquess of Clydesdale and Flight Lieutenant David MacIntyre, make the first flight over Mount Everest, sponsored by Lucy, Lady Houston.
 The Royal Air Force reinstates the squadron of nine to 12 planes as the basic organizational unit for its aircraft assigned to Royal Navy aircraft carriers, retaining the six-plane flight as the basic organizational unit only for aircraft assigned to operate from battleship and cruiser catapults.
 April 4 – The U.S. Navy dirigible  crashes during a storm off the coast of New Jersey, killing 73 of its 76 crewmen. It is the worst aviation accident in history at the time, and no greater loss of life will occur in a single air crash until 1950.
 April 11 – Departing England on April 11 in the Avro Mark VIA Avian Southern Cross, William N. "Bill" Lancaster begins an attempt to set a speed record for a flight to South Africa. He crashes in the Sahara Desert on April 12 and dies on April 20 while awaiting rescue. His mummified body and wrecked aircraft will not be discovered until February 1962.
 April 12
Spartan Air Lines begins flight operations, offering service from Heston Aerodrome outside London to Cowes on the Isle of Wight using three Spartan Cruiser airliners.
William Besler makes the first successful flight in a fixed-wing aircraft powered by a steam engine. The aircraft, a Travel Air 2000 biplane, is powered by an oil-fired, reversible 90°-angle V-twin angle-compound engine he and his brother George designed. The seven-minute trial flight is certified by the National Aeronautical Association.
 April 17 – At Oakland Municipal Airport in Oakland, California, George and William Besler unveil their aviation steam engine to the public for the first time, with William flying the steam-powered Travel Air 2000 in a public demonstration that consists of three flights totaling a combined 15 minutes in the air, banking over San Francisco Bay before returning to the airport. He reaches  and demonstrates the engine's braking power by reversing the propeller on landing and coming to a stop in only . Despite the engine's success and speculation by aviation reporters that steam engines could economically power the airplanes of the future, the Beslers make no further public flights and do not develop the engine further.
 April 19 – The U.S. Navy conducts the first mass seaplane flight from Oahu to French Frigate Shoals, a 759-mile flight. The aircraft return via the Gardner Pinnacles, completing the round trip in 8 hours 10 minutes.
 April 20 – George D. Besler and William J. Besler's prototype steam biplane, based on a Travel Air 2000, makes the first of several demonstration flights at Oakland airport in the San Francisco Bay Area.
 April 29 – The Nazi government in Germany forms the Reichsluftfahrtministerium ("Reich Aviation Ministry").
 April 30 – The first air service internal to Scotland, Renfrew–Campbeltown, begins, operated by Midland & Scottish Air Ferries Ltd. Winifred Drinkwater, "the world's first female commercial pilot", is hired to fly the route.

May
 Turkish Airlines is formed under the name "State Airlines".
 Erhard Milch, State Secretary of the German Reich Air Ministry, receives a major study of the future of a new German air force written by Dr. Robert Knauss. Knauss projects that the main threat to the reestablishment of Germany as a great power will be a preventive attack by France and Poland before Germany can fully rearm, and he recommends the creation of a force of 400 four-engined bombers which could deter such an attack with an ability to attack enemy population and industrial centers and destroy enemy morale.
The RWD-5bis was the smallest plane to have ever flown the Atlantic - empty weight below , loaded 1100 kg. It is a part of 17,885 km Warsaw - Rio de Janeiro flight from April 27 to June 24.
 May 13 – The founder of the British Aircraft Company, Charles H. Lowe-Wylde, is killed while flying a B.A.C. Planette at Maidstone Airport near West Malling, Kent, England.
 May 24 – French intercontinental aviation pioneer Ludovic Arrachart dies when his Caudron C.362 suffers engine failure during preliminary trails for the 1933 Coupe Deutsch de la Meurthe race.
 May 31 – The first regular civil air service from Northern Ireland to Renfrew Airport in Glasgow, Scotland, begins.

June

July
 Misr Airlines, which later will become Egyptair, begins flight operations, using de Havilland DH.84 Dragon airliners to serve Cairo, Alexandria, and Mersa Matruh.
 July 14–22 – Wiley Post, flying a Lockheed Vega, makes the first solo flight around the world.
 July 15–17 – Lithuanian-American pilots Steponas Darius and Stasys Girėnas fly nonstop  in the Bellanca CH-300 Pacemaker Lituanica in an attempt to fly nonstop from New York City to Kaunas, Lithuania, but die when Lituanica crashes  short of Kaunas in Kuhdamm, Germany, on July 17 after 37 hours 11 minutes in the air.
 July 22 – British pilots Amy Johnson and Jim Mollison, flying de Havilland DH.84 Dragon I G-ACCV Seafarer, begin the first non-stop flight from Great Britain to the United States, taking off from Pendine Sands in South Wales and crash landing at Bridgeport, Connecticut.

August
 The French Army's aviation branch, the Aéronautique Militaire, becomes an independent service, the French Air Force (Armée de l'Air).
 August 4 – United States Navy Lieutenant Commander Thomas G. W. Settle attempts to set a new human altitude record in A Century of Progress, a 105-foot- (32-meter-) diameter, 600,000-cubic foot (16,990-cubic meter) balloon with a sealed and pressurized gondola. Launched from Soldier Field in Chicago, Illinois, his flight reaches only  and lasts only 15 minutes before the balloon sinks back to the ground because of a valve that sticks open.
 August 7 – One of the earliest Korean female aviators, Park Kyung-won, dies in a plane crash near Hakone, Japan.
 August 11
One of the largest bombers ever made, the Soviet Union's Kalinin K-7, makes its first flight.
 Boston-Maine Airways, the future Northeast Airlines, becomes a National Airways contract carrier.
 August 29 – The Transcontinental & Western Air Ford 5-AT-B Trimotor NC9607 flies into the side of Mesa Mountain near Quay, New Mexico, during a storm, killing all five people on board.

September
 September 4 – The American aviator Florence Klingensmith dies in the crash of her Gee Bee Model Y Senior Sportster racer (tail number NR718Y) during the Frank Phillips Trophy Race at Chicago, Illinois, leading race organizers to ban women from future races.
 September 7–8 – Six United States Navy Consolidated P2Y flying boats make a non-stop formation flight from Norfolk, Virginia, to the Panama Canal, covering  in 25 hours 20 minutes.
 September 24 – The Soviet sealed cabin balloon USSR-1, intended to carry Georgi Prokofiev, Konstantin Gudenoff, and Ernest Birnbaum in an attempt to set a new altitude record for human flight, fails to launch on the first attempt at making the record flight.
His flight, made from Villacoublay, France, lasts 2 hours 5 minutes.

October
 October 4 – The French aviators Jean Assolant and René Lefèvre take from Oran in French Algeria in the Bernard 81 GR L'Oiseau Canari II, hoping to set a new unrefueled nonstop straight-line world distance record by flying to Saigon in French Indochina. Unexpectedly high fuel consumption puts the record out of reach, and they land in Karachi, having flown  in 27 hours.
 October 4–11 – Sir Charles Kingsford Smith, in a Percival Gull, sets a new solo flight record between England and Australia of 7 days 4 hours 44 minutes.
 October 7 – Air France is formed by the merger of five French airline companies – Air Orient, Air Union, Compagnie Générale Aéropostale, Compagnie Internationale de Navigation Aérienne (CIDNA) and Société Générale des Transports Aériens (SGTA) – beginning operations with 250 planes.
 October 10 – A bomb destroys a United Airlines Boeing 247 in mid-air near Chesterton, Indiana, during a transcontinental flight across the United States. killing all seven people on board. It is the first proven case of sabotage in civil aviation, although no suspect is ever identified.
 October 15 – The Rolls-Royce Merlin engine is started for the first time.
 October 30
 Returning from a tour of Africa, the Couzinet 33 Biarritz crashes at Blaisy-Bas, France.
 During an air show at Amarillo, Texas, two aircraft belonging to a flying circus troupe collide over the city while flying through streamers dropped by a third aircraft. Four people aboard the two aircraft die.

November
 November 2 – The Government of Colombia issues a decree making the Ministry of Agriculture and Commerce responsible for the regulation of civil aviation in Colombia. 
 November 4 – The Brazilian airline VASP is established.
 November 7 – In the Soviet Union, the first air terminal in what will one day be Belarus opens in Minsk in the Byelorussian Soviet Socialist Republic.
 November 20 – Ascending from Akron Municipal Airport in Akron, Ohio, United States Navy Lieutenant Commander Thomas G. W. Settle and United States Marine Corps Major Chester L. Fordney set a new official world altitude record for human flight in the balloon 'A Century of Progress, reaching  before landing near Bridgeton, New Jersey. The altitude is  lower than that reached by the Soviet balloon USSR-1 in September, but the Fédération Aéronautique Internationale (FAI) had not recognized the Soviet record because the Soviet Union is not an FAI member country.
 November 21 – The only completed Kalinin K-7, which had made its first flight only a little over three months before on 11 August, crashes near Kharkov in the Soviet Union after one of its tail booms suffers a structural failure, killing 15 of the 20 people on board. Although two more K-7s are planned, neither is built before the project is cancelled in 1935.

December
 December 1 – Indian National Airways commences the first daily service in India, between Calcutta and Dacca.
 December 13 – President Franklin D. Roosevelt makes Northwest Airways pilot Mal Freeburg the first recipient of the Air Mail Medal of Honor.
 December 19–23 – The Fédération Aéronautique Internationale-sponsored Second International Aviation Meeting takes place in Egypt. The 32 competitors take part in three competitions – a 900-mile (1,450-km), two-day touring event called the "Circuit of the Oases;" a 230-mile (370-km) speed contest; and an "Oasis Trophy" competition in which the contestants compete for the trophy based on the number of point they scored in the other two events.
 December 20–30 – Flying the Curtiss Thrush Outdoor Girl, Helen Richey and Frances Harrell Marsalis employ aerial refueling to remain airborne continuously for 237 hours 43 minutes. They fall short of their goal of remaining in the air until January 1, 1934, but nonetheless shatter the previous continuous flight record of 196 hours set in August 1932 by Marsalis and Louise Thaden.
 December 30 – The Imperial Airways Avro Ten Apollo (G-ABLU) strikes a radio mast and crashes at Ruysselede, Belgium, killing all 10 people on board. King Albert I of Belgium will award Camille van Hove, who is hospitalized with serious burns suffered while trying to rescue victims from the airliners wreckage, the Civic Cross (1st Class).
 December 31
The Latécoère 300 flying boat Croix du Sud ("Southern Cross") sets a world nonstop distance record for seaplanes, flying  from Étang de Berre, France to Saint-Louis, Senegal.
The Government of Venezuela purchases the airline Aeropostal Alas de Venezuela after the Government of France stops subsidizing it.

First flights 
 Avro 639 Cabin Cadet
 Arado Ar 67
 Farman F.270
 Farman F.380
 Kawasaki Ki-3
 Stinson Reliant

January
 Douglas XFD-1
 January 30 – Curtiss T-32 Condor II

February
 Aichi AB-6
 February 1 – Boeing XF6B-1, later redesignated Boeing XBFB-1
 February 6 – Kawanishi E7K (Allied reporting name "Alf")
 February 8 – Boeing 247
 February 10 – Hawker Demon
 February 19 – Vultee V-1

March
 March 1 – Consolidated P-30 (later PB-2)
 March 29 – Miles M.2 Hawk

April
 Cierva C.30
 April 10 – Airspeed Courier G-ABXN
 April 21 – 
 April 22 – Farman F.370
 April 26 – Potez 53
 April 29 – Latécoère 550

May
 Avro 638 Club Cadet
 Farman F.221
 Mitsubishi Ki-2 (Allied reporting name "Louise")
 Northrop Delta
 Stinson Model O
 May 4 – Grumman XJF-1, prototype of the Grumman JF Duck and J2F Duck
 May 9 – Vought XF3U-1
 May 27 – De Havilland Leopard Moth

June
 Seversky SEV-3
 June 11 – Cessna CR-3
 June 21 – Supermarine Walrus
 June 23 – Couzinet 100

July
 Bloch MB.200
 Curtiss XF12C, first United States Navy fighter with folding wings
 July 1 – Douglas DC-1

August
 Avia B.534
 Short Scion
 August 11
 Blériot 5190
 Kalinin K-7
 August 14 – Tupolev ANT-14
 August 24 – Blackburn Shark

September
 September 10 – Mignet HM.14 Pou-du-Ciel
 September 11 – Breguet 521 Bizerte
 September 14 – Boeing XF7B-1

October
 Polikarpov I-15
 October 6 – Pander S-4 Postjager
 October 11 – Blackburn Perth
 October 18 – Grumman XF2F-1, Grummans first single-seat, enclosed-cockpit aircraft and prototype of the Grumman F2F

November
 Focke-Wulf Fw 56
 Between November 11 and 18 – Couzinet 101
 November 14 – Potez 54, prototype of the Potez 540

December
 Curtiss XF13C-2, prototype of the biplane version of the Curtiss XF13C
 Farman F.1020
 Mitsubishi Ki-7 (Allied reporting name "Pine")
 Yokosuka K5Y (Allied reporting name "Willow")
 December 18 – Northrop XFT
 December 31 – Polikarpov I-16

Entered service 
 Arado Ar 65 with the still-secret German Luftwaffe
 Arado Ar 66 with the still-secret German Luftwaffe
 Avro 621 Tutor with the Royal Air Force
 Avro 638 Club Cadet
 Avion Fairey Fox IIM with the Belgian Air Force
 Berliner-Joyce OJ-2 with United States Navy Scouting Squadrons 5 (VS-5B) and 6 (VS-6B)
 Levasseur PL.15 with French Naval Aviation aboard the seaplane carrier Commandant Teste
 PZL P.7a with the Polish Air Force
 Yokosuka K4Y with the Imperial Japanese Navy
 Early 1933 – Westland Wallace with the Royal Air Force

February 
 Curtiss F11C Goshawk with United States Navy Fighter Squadron 1 (VF-1B) aboard , the last Curtiss fighter to enter service with the U.S. Navy

June 
 June 21 – Grumman FF with the U.S. Navy

August 
 Saro Cloud with the Royal Air Force

November
 November 14 – Handley Page Heyford, the last Royal Air Force biplane heavy bomber, with No. 99 Squadron

December
 Stinson Model O with the National Aviation School, forerunner of the Honduran Air Force

Retirements 
 Curtiss F7C Seahawk by the United States Marine Corps

September
Avro 604 Antelope by the Royal Air Force

References

 
Aviation by year